William Gregory may refer to:

Politicians 
 William Gregory (1625–1696), English MP for Hereford and Weobley, Speaker of the House of Commons 
 William Gregory (died 1616), MP for Nottingham
 William Gregory (fl. 1406), MP for Guildford
 William Gregory (lord mayor) (c.1400–1467), Lord Mayor of London 
 William Gregory (mayor) (1896–1970), mayor of Lower Hutt, New Zealand 
 William Gregory (Rhode Island governor) (1849–1901), American governor 
 William Henry Gregory (1817–1892), Anglo-Irish politician, MP for Dublin and County Galway
 William S. Gregory (1825–1887), mayor of Kansas City
 William Voris Gregory (1877–1936), US Congressman from Kentucky

Sports 
 Bill Gregory (born 1949), former American football defensive lineman
 Robert Gregory (RFC officer) (William Robert Gregory, 1881–1918), Irish cricketer and artist

Others 
 Will Gregory (born 1959), British musician with Goldfrapp 
 William Gregory (Carmelite) (fl. 1520), Scottish Carmelite 
 William Gregory (chemist) (1803–1858), Scottish chemist 
 William Gregory (Chief Justice), British jurist and first Chief Justice of Quebec 
 William D. Gregory (1825–1904), American clipper ship captain, later a Union Navy commander 
 William G. Gregory (born 1957), NASA astronaut
 William King Gregory (1876–1970), American zoologist

See also